Grogan is an unincorporated community in Watonwan County, in the U.S. state of Minnesota.

History
Grogan was named in 1890 for Matthew J. Grogan, a pioneer settler. A post office was established at Grogan in 1891, and remained in operation until it was discontinued in 1932.

References

Unincorporated communities in Watonwan County, Minnesota
Unincorporated communities in Minnesota